Workers Party of Socialist Unity (Portuguese: Partido Operário de Unidade Socialista, POUS) is a small Trotskyist former political party in Portugal, founded by Aires Rodrigues and Carmelinda Pereira in 1979 after a split from the Portuguese Socialist Party. It is a member of the Fourth International led by Pierre Lambert. It disbanded itself as a registered political party on November 14, 2020. It will continue to exist as a political association.

References

1976 establishments in Portugal
Communist parties in Portugal
Far-left political parties
Fourth International (ICR)
Organisations based in Lisbon
Political parties established in 1976
Political parties in Portugal
Trotskyist organisations in Portugal